Athol Gordon Townley (3 October 190524 December 1963) was an Australian politician who served in the House of Representatives from 1949 until his death in 1963. A member of the Liberal Party, he served as a minister in the Menzies Government from 1951 to 1963, notably as Minister for Defence from 1958.

Early life
Townley was born in Hobart, Tasmania, and educated at Elizabeth Street State School and Hobart High School, and at Hobart Technical College. He qualified as a pharmaceutical chemist in 1928 and in 1930 found a job looking after quality control for a Sydney baker. In 1931, he married Hazel Florence Greenwood and they later moved back to Hobart where he formed a partnership with his brother, Rex, that eventually owned three pharmacies.

Military service
Townley joined the Royal Australian Navy in September 1940, and in February 1941, he was sent to England to train in bomb- and mine-disposal work. He returned to Australia and commanded the 35 ton patrol boat HMAS Steady Hour, which assisted in destroying a Japanese midget submarine during the attack on Sydney Harbour in June 1942. He was put in command of the Fairmile B motor launch ML817 in January 1943, promoted to acting lieutenant commander in March and was involved in the New Guinea campaign.

Political career

Townley was opposed to Ben Chifley's bank nationalisation and won the Australian House of Representatives seat of Denison in the 1949 election for the Liberal Party of Australia.  Robert Menzies valued his opinion and appointed him to a series of portfolios, starting with Social Services in May 1951, although Paul Hasluck considered Townley a "teacher's pet" and claimed that he had only "slight" administrative abilities.  Menzies appointed Townley Minister for Air and Minister for Civil Aviation in July 1954, Minister for Immigration in October 1956, and Minister for Supply in February 1958.

Townley supported Australia having Nuclear weapons: when in 1956 when Townley,  wrote to Philip McBride, Minister for Defence, recommending the acquisition of tactical nuclear weapons to arm Australia's English Electric Canberra bombers and CAC Sabre fighters.

Townley became Minister for Defence in December 1958.  On 24 May 1962 he announced that Australia would be sending thirty army advisers to South Vietnam, committing Australia to the Vietnam War.  He suffered ill health during the 1960s, including a heart attack and bouts of pneumonia. Nevertheless, he travelled to Washington in October 1963 to sign a contract for the purchase of the F-111 aircraft—this contract was later severely criticised due to the sharply increased prices subsequently experienced.

Death
Townley left the ministry after the 1963 election, and on 17 December it was announced that he would succeed Howard Beale as Australian Ambassador to the United States. However, on 13 December he had collapsed in his Melbourne office and been taken to the Mercy Hospital in East Melbourne. In the preceding year he had suffered a heart ailment and pneumonia. Townley died on Christmas Eve 1963, aged 58. His state funeral in Hobart was attended by Governor-General Lord De L'Isle, Governor of Tasmania Charles Gairdner, Prime Minister Robert Menzies, and Premier of Tasmania Eric Reece, as well as many other dignitaries.

Notes

See also

1905 births
1963 deaths
Liberal Party of Australia members of the Parliament of Australia
Members of the Australian House of Representatives for Denison
Members of the Australian House of Representatives
Members of the Cabinet of Australia
Royal Australian Navy officers
Royal Australian Navy personnel of World War II
Defence ministers of Australia
20th-century Australian politicians